A helipad is a landing area or platform for helicopters and powered lift aircraft. 

While helicopters and powered lift aircraft are able to operate on a variety of relatively flat surfaces, a fabricated helipad provides a clearly marked hard surface away from obstacles where such aircraft can land safely.

Larger helipads, intended for use by helicopters and other vertical take-off and landing aircraft (VTOL), may be called vertiports. An example is Vertiport Chicago, which opened in 2015.

Usage

Helipads may be located at a heliport or airport where fuel, air traffic control and service facilities for aircraft are available. 

Most helipads are located remote from populated areas due to sounds, winds, space and cost constraints. However, some skyscrapers maintain a helipad on their roofs in order to accommodate air taxi services. Some basic helipads are built on top of highrise buildings for evacuation in case of a major fire outbreak. Major police departments may use a dedicated helipad at heliports as a base for police helicopters. 

Large ships and oil platforms usually have a helipad on board for emergency use. In such a case, the terms "helicopter deck", "helideck", or "helodeck" are used.

Helipads are common features at hospitals where they serve to facilitate medical evacuation or air ambulance transfers of patients to trauma centers or to accept patients from remote areas without local hospitals or facilities capable of providing the level of emergency medicine required. In urban environments, these heliports are sometimes located on the roof of the hospital.

Rooftop helipads sometimes display a large two-digit number, representing the weight limit (in thousands of pounds) of the pad. In addition, a second number may be present, representing the maximum rotor diameter in feet.

Location identifiers are often, but not always, issued for helipads. They may be issued by the appropriate aviation authority.  Authorized agencies include the Federal Aviation Administration in the United States,  Transport Canada in Canada, the International Civil Aviation Organization, and the International Air Transport Association. Some helipads may have location identifiers from multiple sources, and these identifiers may be of different format and name.

Construction
Helipads are usually constructed out of concrete and are marked with a circle and/or a letter "H", so as to be visible from the air. However, they are not always constructed out of concrete; sometimes wildfire fighters will construct a temporary helipad out of timbers to receive supplies in remote areas. Rig mats may be used to build helipads. Landing pads may also be constructed in extreme conditions such as on ice.

The world's highest helipad, built by India, is located on the Siachen Glacier at a height of 21,000 feet (6400 m) above sea level.

Portable helipads
A portable helipad is a helipad structure with a rugged frame that can be used to land helicopters in any areas with slopes of up to 30 degrees, such as hillsides, riverbeds and boggy areas. Portable helipads can be transported by helicopter or powered-lift to place them where a VTOL needs to land, as long as there are no insurmountable obstructions nearby.

Gallery

See also

 Helicopter landing officer

References

Bibliography
 de Voogt, A.J. 2007. Helidrome Architecture. Rotterdam: 010 Publishers.
 ICAO 1995. Heliport manual. Montreal, Canada: ICAO Publications.

Airfields
Heliports